This is a list of minority governors and lieutenant state governors in the United States. In the United States, an ethnic minority is anyone who has at least one parent who is not of non-Hispanic white descent (such as African Americans, Asian Americans, Pacific Islands Americans, Hispanic and Latino Americans, or Native Americans). Ethnic minorities currently constitute around 38.9% of the total population. United States governors are included but lieutenant governor-equivalent roles (positions next in the line of succession absent an office of the lieutenant governor, such as secretary of state or senate president) are not currently included.

List of ethnic-minority governors

Italics denotes acting governor

Territorial governors
Several governors of U.S. territories have been ethnic minorities. Many of these officials were appointed before elections were instituted in these jurisdictions. In each of the five current U.S. territories, Hispanic or non-white ethnic groups make up large majorities: Puerto Rican Hispanic Americans in Puerto Rico, African Americans in the U.S. Virgin Islands, Chamorros in Guam and the Northern Mariana Islands, and Samoans in American Samoa. Elected governors and some appointed governors in these territories that have come from these majority ethnic groups are not listed here; for more details see List of governors of Puerto Rico, List of governors of the United States Virgin Islands, List of governors of Guam, List of governors of the Northern Mariana Islands, and List of governors of American Samoa.

Italics denotes acting governor

List of ethnic-minority lieutenant governors

Italics denotes acting lieutenant governor

Territorial lieutenant governors
In each of the four current U.S. territories that have the office of lieutenant governor, non-white ethnic groups make up large majorities: African Americans in the U.S. Virgin Islands, Chamorros in Guam and the Northern Mariana Islands, and Samoans in American Samoa. Elected governors and some appointed governors in these territories that have come from these majority ethnic groups are not listed here; for more details see Lieutenant Governor of the United States Virgin Islands, Lieutenant Governor of Guam, Lieutenant Governor of the Northern Mariana Islands, and Lieutenant Governor of American Samoa.

See also
 Governor (United States)
 List of current United States governors
 List of U.S. state governors born outside the United States

References

External links
 Rutgers Program on the Governor

Minority
 Minority|*